The German Climate Action Plan 2050 is a climate protection policy document approved by the German government on 14November 2016. The plan outlines measures by which Germany can meet its various national greenhouse gas emissions reduction goals through to 2050 (see table) and service its international commitments under the 2016 Paris Climate Agreement. The Federal Ministry for the Environment, Nature Conservation, Building and Nuclear Safety (BMUB), under minister Barbara Hendricks, led the development of the plan. The plan was progressively watered down since a draft was first leaked in early May 2016. Projections from the environment ministry in September 2016 indicate that Germany will likely miss its 2020 climate target.

The Climate Action Plan2050 should not be confused with an earlier document, the Climate Action Programme2020, approved in December 2014 and which only covers the period until 2020. In early 2017 it was agreed that the 2020 Programme would be scrapped.

Climate targets 

Germany announced the following official greenhouse gas emissions targets on 28September 2010.

Regarding European Union policy, in October 2009 the Council of the European Union agreed that the appropriate abatement objective for Europe and other developed economies was 80–95% below 1990 levels by 2050 (consistent with Germany).  
In October 2014 the European Council endorsed a binding European Union target of an at least 40% reduction in domestic greenhouse gas emissions by 2030 relative to 1990 (less stringent than Germany).

Climate Action Programme 2020 

The Climate Action Programme2020 is an attempt by Germany to help meet its official 2020 greenhouse gas emissions reductions target after a 'climate gap' had been identified. Projections from 2013 show Germany may miss its 40% reductions target by about  without additional measures. The first draft of the programme was released in  2014. How best to control the contribution from coal-fired generation remained controversial, but economy and energy minister Sigmar Gabriel (SPD) dismissed plans aired in his ministry in October 2014 to retire 10GW of coal capacity.

The Climate Action Programme2020 was approved on 3December 2014.  The official document is available in English.

The most significant part of the new package is a pledge to cut electricity sector emissions substantially by 2020. To do so, the government proposes to cap emissions from the sector at 22million tonnes between 2016 and 2020 or 4.4million tonnes each year. Once the cap is in place, energy companies will be allocated allowances based on their current emissions. If they cut their emissions by a greater amount, they may be able to sell their surplus to other companies. The package also contains measures to improve energy efficiency and the transport sector. Environmental groups criticized the package for not going far enough in reducing the reliance on coal-fired generation.

In December 2015, the government remained confident that its 2020 emissions target will be met through the measures contained in the programme and elsewhere. However, a government report, released on 30September 2016, shows that Germany will meet its 2020 greenhouse gas commitments only under "a best case scenario". The report, prepared for the European Union, is available in German. The analysis projects Germany's greenhouse gas emissions forward for the next 20years.

A PwC report from November 2016 evaluates the economic and ecological effects of the Climate Action Programme2020 and finds that the economic benefits outweigh the costs of the proposed measures. Based on the report, environment minister Barbara Hendricks said in a press release that "the programme will create  additional jobs and a GDP increase of 1% by 2020".

In early 2017 the government agreed to scrap the 2020 plan entirely.

Development of the Climate Action Plan 2050 

The history of the Climate Action Plan2050 is quite involved. The Federal Ministry for the Environment, Nature Conservation, Building and Nuclear Safety (BMUB) is the lead agency for the plan, under the direction of environment minister Barbara Hendricks (SPD). A novel public consultation process was utilized to collect ideas from state and city governments, advocacy groups, and citizens and these ideas were then used to help create the first version. Internal drafts of the plan were leaked three times to the media in 2016, the first in early May, the second in late June, and the third in early November.

Coalition agreement: 2013 

The notion of a climate action plan arose from the coalition agreement between the CDU, CSU, and SPD parties in 2013. The agreement stated:

Public consultation: 25 June 2015 – 19 March 2016 

A public consultation with stakeholders began on  2015 with a Kick-off Conference in Berlin. A discussion paper for this exercise was dated 9June 2015 and is available in English. The consultation process involved a series of meetings with states, municipalities, associations, and citizens, with delegates selected to represent these various groupings in subsequent forums. The process was organized by the Wuppertal Institute and the dialog agency IFOK. The resulting proposals for action were collated and presented at a meeting at the environment ministry (BMUB) on  2016. The final report is available in German. This input was used to help create the first draft of the Climate Action Plan2050. The German government also explained its public participation process at the 2015 United Nations Climate Change Conference on 9December 2015. The design of the consultation process was novel for Germany. An explanatory video from the BMUB is available.

First leaked draft: early May 2016 

A draft of the plan was leaked to media for the first time in early May 2016. It was the result of consolidating a long catalog of measures from the consultation process. The leaked plan included proposals for:

 ecological tax reform and the internalization of environmental costs
 climate friendly investment
 reducing emissions from coal and a phase-out of coal well before 2050
 making both old and new buildings climate-neutral
 the digitalisation and electrification of the transport sector
 a floor price for carbon and climate-aware investment
 a reduction in the numbers of ruminant animals and for the public to eat less meat
 the use forests as carbon sinks and the renaturalisation of moorlands for the same purpose
 the investigation of a new national welfare index
 the embedding of climate protection in local and regional public services

Following the leaked document, state governments became increasingly concerned that they were being railroaded into climate change goals that could damage their regional economies.

Second leaked draft: 21 June 2016 

A draft of the plan was leaked to media for the second time in late June 2016. The draft was dated 21June 2016 and is available for download in German. Unlike the first leak, this draft was compiled after consultation with the economics and energy ministry (BMWi).

The new draft shows that individual sectors may escape specific emissions targets and that an end date for coal-fired generation has been omitted. Earlier versions had contained sector-specific targets for energy, transport, industry, buildings, and agriculture. The energy sector which was previously slated to make a "considerable" contribution is now required to make an "adequate" contribution. Rather than saying that coal-fired generation must "end well before 2050" the new draft emphasizes that "the importance of power production from coal will decrease" and that there will be a "step-by-step reduction". The previous draft stated that the transport sector would need to deliver "disproportionately high" emissions reductions (on account of the poor performance of the sector to date), that has now diminished to an "ambitious" contribution. Other proposals remain, including the development of ecological tax reform. The plan also includes targets for modernizing the heating and cooling systems in buildings, including no new fossil-fueled heating systems in houses after 2030.

The proposal for a Commission on Climate Protection, Growth, Structural Change, and the Completion of the Energiewende remains, but now without the specific task of developing a roadmap for the phase-out of coal.

The weakening of the plan is also a result of industry associations repeatedly criticizing sector targets and itemized measures, which they fear would harm Germany's economic performance and international competitiveness.

Official draft: 6 September 2016 

An official draft was released on 6September 2016 and is available in German. This draft retains a provision for the establishment of a Commission on Climate Protection, Growth, Structural Change, and the Completion of the Energiewende.

The content however has been watered down considerably. Concrete emissions reductions targets were removed altogether. The previously leaked June 2016 draft stated that by 2030 "a large majority of newly registered cars" would need to be powered by either electricity or biofuels. However, the new draft merely states that "the government aims to significantly lower car emissions by 2030" and that electric cars can contribute to that goal.

Environmental groups have become increasingly critical of the plan as each iteration led to a watering down of its climate protection provisions. The NGOs were particularly concerned about the lack of detail concerning a coal phase-out. On 24 September 2016, Greenpeace Germany issued a report critical of the watering down of the results of the consultation process.

Cabinet deliberations: late 2016 

In late 2016, the plan went to the Chancellery to coordinate the final version to be agreed by the German cabinet.

Media reports in late October 2016 suggest a deepening rift between the economics and energy ministry (BMWi) and the environment ministry (BMUB) over the plan and the exit process for coal-fired generation. Economy and energy minister Sigmar Gabriel opposes the setting of a coal exit date before job alternatives for lignite workers have been determined.

A revised draft plan, circulated by the environment ministry on 4November 2016, was obtained by Süddeutsche Zeitung. The plan has become more stringent and now includes passages that had earlier been removed during the negotiations between ministries. The new plan also precludes new coal-fired generation and the expansion of existing open-pit mines and calls on the government to lobby for an EU-wide floor price for auctioned EU ETS emissions allowances.

On 7November 2016, over 40 German companies, including energy suppliers EnBW and MVV Energie and network operator 50Hertz, together with Commerzbank, Deutsche Telekom, IKEA, and Hochtief, are lobbying for a more ambitious program, one which ensures that Germany's Paris Agreement commitments are met. The companies want sector-specific emissions targets for 2030 and state that "only in this way can new business models and concrete plans for decarbonisation be developed". They want the goal to be the "rapid switch to 100% renewable energy". British economist Nicholas Stern also backs a more ambitious plan. The original statement from the companies is available.

On 8November 2016, economy and energy minister Gabriel vetoed the plan amid concerns by trade union IG BCE and supported by the BDI industry group. The draft does not timetable a phase-out for brown coal, notwithstanding Gabriel said he expected brown coal to remain in use past 2040. On 11November 2016, Reuters news agency reported that chancellor Angela Merkel and ministers Gabriel and Hendricks had agreed on a new draft.

Approval: 14 November 2016 

On 14November 2016, the cabinet officially adopted and released the new plan. It was overseen by a CDU/CSU/SPD grand coalition government, led by Angela Merkel. The timing allowed environment minister Barbara Hendricks to present the German plan at the COP22 climate talks held in Marrakesh, Morocco. Canada, Mexico, and the US also presented climate action plans.

Climate Action Plan 2050 

The official Climate Action Plan2050 is available in German and runs to 91pages. An official summary of the principles and goals underpinning the plan is available in English.

The plan is to be supplemented by a program of policy measures, developed by the German parliament, with the first such program to be in place in 2018. Annual reporting will track progress and should facilitate specific policy adjustments where needed.

Preamble 

The plan begins with a preamble that states that the document is an evolving work in progress and "cannot and does not want to be a detailed masterplan". It adds that there will be "no rigid provisions" and that the plan is technology neutral and open to innovation. The preamble stresses that the government will simultaneously maintain German competitiveness:

The preamble also reiterates Germany's 2010 climate targets (see table) and its 2016 Paris Agreement commitment.

Sector targets 

Sector targets remained controversial during the development of the plan. Notwithstanding, the official document now specifies sector targets for the first time under a national climate protection policy. The initial sector targets will be subject to a comprehensive impact assessment and consultation and may well be adjusted as a result in 2018.

For comparison, the Paris Agreement nationally determined contribution (NDC) for Germany is −55% relative to 1990 (which accords with the final cell in the table).

Commission for growth, structural change, and regional development 

The plan establishes a commission for growth, structural change, and regional development. Unlike earlier versions, the commission will not be tasked with setting a date for an exit from coal. Instead, the commission will "support the structural changes" resulting from transformation and will "develop a mix of instruments that will bring together economic development, structural change, social acceptability and climate protection". The commission will be based at the economics and energy ministry, but will consult with other ministries, federal states, municipalities, and unions, as well as with representatives of "affected" companies and regions. The commission is scheduled to start work at the beginning of 2018 and to report at the end of 2018.

EU Emissions Trading System 

The plan stresses to role of the European Union Emission Trading System (EUETS) as the primary climate protection instrument covering the energy sector and parts of industry in central Europe. The government wants to strengthen price signaling and will campaign to make the EUETS "effective" at a European level. Earlier provisions to set a floor price for emissions allowances were removed.

Energy sector 

The energy sector GHG target for 2030 is  tonnes eq or a reduction of 61–62% relative to 1990. The energy supply must be "almost completely decarbonised" by 2050, with renewables as its main source. For the electricity sector, "in the long-term, electricity generation must be based almost entirely on renewable energies" and "the share of wind and solar power in total electricity production will rise significantly".

If "possible and economically sensible", renewable energy will be used directly in all sectors, and electricity from renewable sources will be used efficiently for heating, transport, and industry. The utilization of biomass will be limited and sourced mostly from waste. The plan states that transitioning to a power supply based on renewables while ensuring supply security is "technically feasible". During the transition, "less carbon-intensive natural gas power plants and the existing most modern coal power plants play an important role as interim technologies".

The plan states that "the climate targets can only be reached if coal-fired power generation is reduced step-by-step". Moreover, the German government "in its development cooperation does not lend support to new coal power plants". Regions which depend on coal, like the Lausitz, need special consideration: "we must succeed in establishing concrete perspectives for the future of the affected regions, before concrete decisions on the step-by-step withdrawal from the lignite industry can be taken".

Notwithstanding, a coal phase-out for Germany is implied in the plan, environment minister Barbara Hendricks said in an interview on 21November 2016. "If you read the Climate Action Plan carefully, you will find that the exit from coal-fired power generation is the immanent consequence of the energy sector target.... By 2030... half of the coal-fired power production must have ended, compared to 2014", Hendricks said.

The plan also establishes a regional fund to foster new businesses in lignite mining regions. The government will need to ensure that EU competition law does not inhibit the operation of the fund.

Building sector 

The building sector GHG target for 2030 is  tonnes eq or a reduction of 66–67% relative to 1990. Under the plan, Germany's building stock will be largely carbon-neutral by 2050 and their limited energy needs will be met through renewables. Due to the slow turnover of buildings, the groundwork for this goal must be laid by 2030. The government will invest heavily in programs to implement high energy standards for buildings. Heating, cooling, and electricity supply will be progressively switched to renewables. The government will terminate support programs that rely on fossil fuels by 2020 and switch instead to support programs using renewable systems. The aim is to "make renewables-based systems much more attractive than fossil-fuel-based ones".

Transport sector 

The transport sector GHG target for 2030 is  tonnes eq or a reduction of 40–42% relative to 1990.  Unlike earlier drafts, the plan does not now set a deadline for all new cars to be emissions free.  Rather the plan states that stricter emissions limits for new cars will be set by the European Union and that "the government will advocate [an] ambitious development of the targets" so that its 2030 goal can be met.  These cuts will derive from improved efficiencies and increasingly GHG-neutral energy.  Such cuts will require "a significant contribution by the electrification of new cars and should have priority".  The plan emphasizes the contribution that biofuels can make, stating that "in the target scenario, the energy supply of street and rail traffic, as well as parts of air and maritime traffic and inland shipping is switched to biofuels – if ecologically compatible – and otherwise largely to renewable electricity as well as other GHG-neutral fuels".  The need to support public transport, rail transport, and cycling is stressed in the plan.  The plan states a next step is to determine the framework needed to ensure that new powertrain technologies and energy forms will be adopted at scale.  This then "involves the question of when, at the latest, they should be introduced into the market, and what penetration rate they should achieve by what date".

Industry 

The industry GHG target for 2030 is  tonnes eq or a reduction of 49–51% relative to 1990.  Good progress has been made and, the sector must reduce its emissions by about another 20%.  Notwithstanding, the plan emphasizes the need to maintain international competitiveness:

The plan continues that, despite the costs and challenges, climate protection could become an "innovation motor" for a modern high-tech economy.  The plan acknowledges that some industrial emissions cannot be avoided – for instance, those from steel production or chemical plants.  Such emissions should be reduced as far as possible by developing new processes and replacing old ones – or through the use of carbon capture and utilization (CCU) or carbon capture and storage (CCS).  The government will launch a research and development program to advance these and other low-carbon processes.

Agricultural sector 

The agricultural sector GHG target for 2030 is  tonnes eq or a reduction of 31–34% relative to 1990.  The plan acknowledges that agriculture cannot reach zero emissions, due to the biological processes inherent in plant cultivation and livestock farming.  Instead the plan will focus on reducing emissions as much as possible and on the more efficient use of resources.  About one third of agricultural emissions are due to nitrous oxide from fertilizer use.  The government wants to reduce these emissions through better management and through research and development.  Another one third of emissions derive from ruminant animals.  The government will develop a comprehensive strategy to reduce emissions from livestock farming by 2021.  The plan states that 20% of agricultural land by 2030 "should be used for organic farming", compared with 6.3% in 2014.  The government also advocates the use of financial instruments under a reformed EU Common Agricultural Policy to reduce GHG emissions from the sector."

Land use and forestry sector 

The land use and forestry sector offers opportunities for carbon sequestration. The government will prioritize improving the performance of forests as carbon sinks. Sustainable forest management will also be promoted and permanent grasslands and marshes are to be preserved.

Financial matters 

Under the plan, the government will consider how to incrementally revise taxation through to 2050, on the understanding that "environmental taxes and levies can create incentives for ecological economic activity" and that "environmentally related taxes and levies can cost-efficiently trigger climate-friendly economic behavior".  The government also intends to reduce environmentally harmful subsidies.  In addition, the government will support efforts to reconcile global finance flows with climate protection goals, for instance through its role on the G20 Financial Stability Board.

Implementation and revision of the plan 

The plan is predicated on a gradual transformation, achieved through a learning process involving the scientific community and accompanied by public dialogue. It is therefore intended that the plan can and should respond to changing technological, political, and social conditions.  The plan will be reviewed every five years to align it with the evolution of Germany's nationally determined contribution (NDC) under the Paris Agreement.  The first update is therefore slated for late 2019 or early 2020. As early as 2018, the government intends to strengthen the plan by quantifying the various emission reduction efforts and their associated ecological, social, and economic impacts. The sector targets may be modified as a result. Annual reporting should help the government to evaluate and adjust its specific climate protection measures in the short-term.

Reactions 

Thilo Schaefer, climate and energy expert at the Cologne Institute for Economic Research (IW), comments that "it looks like the government forgot that the energy sector and industry already participate in the European emissions trading system... in the end, it will simply become more expensive for the affected sectors, but they won't save a single extra ton of ... because the emissions saved by German sectors can be emitted by other states".

Simone Peter, co-chair of the Green Party, said "this is not a good plan anymore, it has become an empty shell, because the ministerial colleagues of [environment minister] Hendricks have removed anything that could be of relevance – be it the coal exit, the end of the combustion engine, or a transition in agriculture".

Klaus Töpfer, founding director of the Institute for Advanced Sustainability Studies (IASS), said "this plan is certainly not yet capable of securing the German contribution to the Paris Climate Agreement.  This will require more work".

Regine Günther, director of policy and climate at WWF Germany, said "today's climate action plan is only a fraction of what is needed. The only plus point: all sectors get precise reduction targets, which WWF welcomes. However, the list of negatives is much longer: there are no appropriate measures to reach those targets. There is also a blank on the issue of coal. The plan completely dropped the urgently needed ban on further extension of open cast mining. The commission on coal will not start until 2018, after the federal elections. A minimum price on carbon is also missing completely. With this plan, the industry and energy lobbies have proven how well placed they are in the economy ministry. With such a plan there can be no ambitious climate protection."

Ottmar Edenhofer, a German climate economist and director of the MCC, criticized the plan. He said economy and energy minister "Sigmar Gabriel yielded to lobbyists and sadly put short-term interests before long-term interests".

See also 

 Barbara Hendricks (SPD) – the environment minister during the development of the plan
 Climate change mitigation – actions to limit climate change
 Energiewende in Germany – the German energy system transition
 German Federal Ministry for Economic Affairs and Energy (BMWi)
 German Federal Ministry for the Environment, Nature Conservation, Building and Nuclear Safety (BMUB)

Notes

References

External links 

 Climate Action Programme2020 – approved version dated 3December 2014 (this initiative preceded the Climate Action Plan2050)
 Klimaschutzplan2050 — approved version dated 14November 2016 (in German)
 Climate Action Plan2050 website (in German)
 German 2050 Climate Action Plan (full document in English)
 Climate Action Plan 2050 Executive Summary in English
Explanatory Film - The Climate Action Plan: Step-by-step to a liveable future. BMU. 11.12.2018. https://www.youtube.com/watch?v=WSJTKyDuI6I
Explanatory Film - The Climate Action Plan: Successful climate action has to be a cooperative undertaking. BMU. 11.12.2018. https://www.youtube.com/watch?v=_ZX4BXhmjMk
Explanatory Film - The Climate Action Plan: Moving together towards a bright future. BMU. 11.12.2018. https://www.youtube.com/watch?v=79FzzI920xg

Climate action plans
Climate change in Germany
Emissions reduction
Climate change policy
Coal phase-out
Energy in Germany
Energy policy of Germany
Renewable energy in Germany